The Janggakty Botanical Reserve (also Жанчыкты Janchykty) is located in Leylek District of Batken Region of Kyrgyzstan. It was established in 1975 with a purpose of conservation of the Red Book listed endemic Tulipa affinis. The botanical reserve occupies 80 hectares.

References

Batken Region
Botanical reserves in Kyrgyzstan
Protected areas established in 1975